Tim Krabbé (born 13 April 1943) is a Dutch journalist, novelist and chess player.

Krabbé was born in Amsterdam. His writing has appeared in most major periodicals in the Netherlands. Once a competitive cyclist, he is known to Dutch readers for his novel De Renner (The Rider), first published in 1978 and translated into English in 2002, of which The Guardian's Matt Seaton wrote: "Nothing better is ever likely to be written on the subjective experience of cycle-racing". English readers know him primarily for The Vanishing (Dutch: Spoorloos, literally: "Traceless" or "Without a Trace"), the translation of his 1984 novel Het Gouden Ei (The Golden Egg), which was made into an acclaimed 1988 Dutch film for which Krabbé co-wrote a script. A poorly received American remake was made in 1993. In 1997 he published De grot, translated as The Cave and published in the U.S. in 2000. In 2009, he wrote the "Boekenweekgeschenk", called Een Tafel vol Vlinders.

Krabbé is a strong chess player who competed in two Dutch Chess Championships in 1967 and 1971. He maintains a chess website, and is renowned for his writings on the subject, in particular on chess problems; for instance, one of his publications is devoted to the Babson task.
No longer an active player, his peak FIDE rating was 2290.

His father was the painter Maarten Krabbé (1908–2005) and his mother the Jewish film translator Margreet Reiss. He is the brother of actor Jeroen Krabbé and the multimedia artist/designer Mirko Krabbé, and the uncle of Martijn Krabbé, a Dutch media personality.

References

External links
  
 
 
 
 
 

1943 births
Living people
Dutch chess players
Dutch Jews
Dutch journalists
Dutch people of Jewish descent
Sportspeople from Amsterdam
Writers from Amsterdam
Dutch chess writers
Dutch male novelists
Chess composers
Dutch screenwriters
Dutch male screenwriters
Cycling writers